Cephalanthera erecta , the erect cephalanthera (Japanese: gin-ran, the "silver orchid", and Chinese: yin lan), is a species of terrestrial orchid. It is found in China, Japan, Korea, Kuril Islands, Bhutan, Assam and eastern Himalayas.

The tiny-leaved form subaphylla obtains most of its carbon via mycoheterotrophy. It is associated mainly with Thelephoraceae fungi.

See also 
 List of the vascular plants in the Red Data Book of Russia

References

External links 
 Pictures of fo. subaphylla at wildplantsshimane.jp

erecta
Myco-heterotrophic orchids
Terrestrial orchids
Orchids of Asia
Orchids of Assam
Orchids of China
Orchids of Japan
Orchids of Korea
Orchids of Russia
Flora of Bhutan
Flora of East Himalaya
Flora of the Kuril Islands
Plants described in 1859